Puttur Narasimha Nayak is a Kannada and Konkani singer and vocalist from Karnataka.  He sings devotional songs, chiefly Haridasa compositions, and Carnatic classical music.

Personal life
Born in a Gowd Saraswat Brahmin family, Nayak began to learn music at the age of 14.  He took his initial lessons in music from Puttur Devdas Nayak.

He is a native of Dakshina Kannada district. He lives with his wife and two children in Bangalore.

Career
In 1977, he started singing for Konkani, Kannada and Tulu films including Kendada Male, Ujwadu and music by L. Vaidyanathan, Gauri Ganesha, and Rajan–Nagendra.  Puttur Nayak won the award for Best Male Playback Singer at the Karnataka State Film Awards in 1992.  He was awarded the Sri Raghavendra award in 2005. He has sung more than ten thousand devotional, motion picture, and folk songs in 14 Indian languages.
He has performed in more than three thousand concerts across the world.  He has toured the US and Bahrain several times and served as a representative in the Kannada conferences abroad.

List of Audio released

108 Shiva Chants – Puttur Narasimha Nayak (Sanskrit)
	Basava Basava (Basaveshwara Vachana) – Puttur Narasimha Nayak, BR Chaya, Kasturi Shankar 
	Bhagya Pradayini Goravanahalli Shri Lakshmi by Puttur Narasimha Nayak, KS Surekha, BR Chaya 
	Bhagyada Ganapa Barayya by Puttur Narasimha Nayak 
	Bilwastothara Shatanamavali (Sanskrit) by Puttur Narasimha Nayak 
	Bilwastothara Shatanamavali (Sanskrit) by Puttur Narasimha Nayak 
	Daasanaagu Sung by Putturu Narasimha Nayak 
	Daasara Padagalu Vol 1 – Puttur Narasimha Nayak 
	Dasakirthana (Dasara Padagalu) – Puttur Narasimha Nayak 
	Gururaja Gurusarvabhouma (Dasara Padagalu) – Puttur Narasimha Nayak
	Hari Dasara Sri Raghavendra Nama Vali by Puttur Narasimha Nayak 
	Jaganmohanane Krishna (Dasara Padagalu) by Puttur Narasimha Nayak 
	Jai Jai Krishna Mukunda Murari (Bhajans) – Puttur Narasimha Nayak 
	Jayathu Jayathu Raghavendra Puttur Narasimha Nayak 
	Sri Lakshmi Hrudaya Stotra – Puttur Narasimha Nayak
	Madhwanama – Puttur Narasimha Nayak 
	Mungodadha Madeshwara – Puttur Narasimha Nayak, Sowmya 
	Olidu Baarayya Raghavendra by Puttur Narasimha Nayak 
	Om Gam Ganapatheye Namaha – Chantings by Puttur Narasimha Nayak 
	Paliso Venkataramana (Dasara Padagalu) – Puttur Narasimha Nayak 
	Raaya Baaro Raghavendra Baaro (Dasara Pada) by Puttur Narasimha Nayak 
	Rama Hare Krishna Hare (Dasara Padagalu) – Puttur Narasimha Nayak 
	Shri Raghavendram (Sanskrit) by Puttur Narasimha Nayak 
	Sindhoora Ganapa by Vani Jayaram, Chandrika Gururaj, Puttur Narasimha Nayak 
	Sri Ganesha Divya Darshana by Puttur Narasimha Nayak, BR Chaya, Soumya 
	Sri Ganesha Suprabhatha by Puttur Narasimha Nayak, BR Chaya, KS Surekha 
	Dasa Sangama Puttur Narasimha Nayak,
	Pavamana Puttur Narasimha Nayak,

References

Living people
20th-century Indian male classical singers
People from Dakshina Kannada district
Singers from Karnataka
Carnatic singers
21st-century Indian male classical singers
Recipients of the Rajyotsava Award 2005
1958 births